Keene is an unincorporated community in Wabaunsee County, Kansas, United States.

History
A post office was opened in Keene in 1877, and remained in operation until it was discontinued in 1901.

Keene Cemetery is located about one and a half miles to the east on Highway K-4.

Education
The community is served by Mission Valley USD 330 public school district.

References

Further reading

External links
 Wabaunsee County maps: Current, Historic, KDOT

Unincorporated communities in Wabaunsee County, Kansas
Unincorporated communities in Kansas